Lajos Koutny (17 October 1939 – 21 December 2022) was a Hungarian ice hockey player. He played for the Hungary men's national ice hockey team at the 1964 Winter Olympics in Innsbruck.

Koutny died on 21 December 2022, at the age of 83.

References

1939 births
2022 deaths
Ice hockey players at the 1964 Winter Olympics
Olympic ice hockey players of Hungary
Ice hockey people from Budapest